The 2013 Audi Cup was the third edition of the Audi Cup, a two-day association football tournament that featured four teams, and was played at the Allianz Arena in Munich, Germany. The competition hosted the 2009 Audi Cup winners Bayern Munich, the 2012 Copa Sudamericana champions São Paulo, the 2011–12 Premier League champions Manchester City and perennial Serie A contenders Milan. The English and Brazilian clubs made their first appearances in the competition, while Bayern, as hosts, and Milan have been present in every Audi Cup so far. The winners of the tournament were Bayern Munich, who beat Manchester City 2–1 in the final. Milan defeated São Paulo 1–0 in the third place play-off.

Prior to the semi-final match between Bayern Munich and São Paulo, as the Bayern goalkeepers were warming up, advertising billboards located around the field were showing fan messages published via their Twitter profiles using the hashtag #HelloAudiCup. One of the displayed messages stated, "Ei, Douglas, vai tomar no cu" ("Hey, Douglas, go fuck yourself!"). It was sent by @DarkFabuloso, a fake profile that satirizes São Paulo player Luís Fabiano, and was inadvertently approved by the staff responsible for selecting and displaying the messages.

Participating teams

Competition format
The competition took the format of the latter stages of a regular knock-out competition. The winners of each of the two matches on the first day competed against each other for the Audi Cup, whilst the two losing sides playing in a third-place match. The trophy was contested over two days, each day seeing two matches played back-to-back. The official matchups were announced on 19 June 2013.

Matches
All times are local (CEST; UTC+02:00).

Semi-finals

Third place play-off

Final

Goalscorers
2 goals
 Mario Mandžukić (Bayern Munich)
 Edin Džeko (Manchester City)
 Stephan El Shaarawy (Milan)

1 goal
 Thomas Müller (Bayern Munich)
 Mitchell Weiser (Bayern Munich)
 Aleksandar Kolarov (Manchester City)
 Álvaro Negredo (Manchester City)
 Micah Richards (Manchester City)
 David Silva (Manchester City)
 Kingsley Boateng (Milan)
 Andrea Petagna (Milan)

References

External links
 Official website
 Audi Cup Schedule & Fixtures

Audi Cup
Audi Cup